Justo Sierra Méndez (January 26, 1848 – September 13, 1912), was a Mexican prominent liberal writer, historian, journalist, poet and political figure during the Porfiriato, in the second half of the nineteenth century and early twentieth century.  He was a leading voice of the Científicos, "the scientists" who were the intellectual leaders during the regime of  Porfirio Díaz.

Life and career

He was the son of Mexican novelist Justo Sierra O'Reilly, who is credited with inspiring his son with the spirit of literature. Sierra moved to Mexico City at the age of 13 in 1861, the year of his father's death, and also, coincidentally, the year of the French intervention in Mexico. Together with his fellow young students, Sierra responded with patriotic fervor to the invasion of his country, and became a lifelong militant liberal.

His most enduring works are sociopolitical histories (at times verging on memoirs) of the era of Benito Juárez and Porfirio Díaz, particularly his political biography of Juárez and his Evolución política del pueblo mexicano. Antonio Caso is considered the definitive statement of the age of the Reform in Mexico. Sierra was elected a member of the Mexican Academy of Language in 1887, and served as the Academy's sixth director from 1910 until his death in 1912.

Public service
Elected to several terms as a representative  in the federal Chamber of Deputies, Sierra also served the government in various posts. From 1905 to 1911, he agreed to serve as the Secretary of Public Education under the Díaz regime. However, he never made a secret of his liberal sympathies and his distaste for the politics of the authoritarian regime. After the overthrow of Díaz in May 1911 and the election of Francisco I. Madero at the outset of the Mexican Revolution, Madero chose Sierra to serve as the Mexican ambassador to Spain. Sierra died from an aneurysm in Madrid in 1912 while serving in his post. His remains were returned to Mexico, where president Madero presided over his magnificent funeral.

Historian
Justo Sierra made significant contributions to the writing of Mexican history.  His texts on pre-revolutionary Mexico continued to be used in Mexican public schools even after the Mexican Revolution. President Álvaro Obregón's Minister of Public Education, José Vasconcelos republished Sierra's Historia Patria for use in schools.

Selected works

Compendio de historia general, México, 1878
Compendio de la historia de la antigüedad, México, 1880
Confesiones de un pianista, México, 1882
Historia general, México, 1891
Cuentos románticos, México, 1896, 1934, 1946
Juárez. Su obra y su tiempo, México, 1905–1906
Historia de México. La Conquista. La Nueva España, Madrid, 1917
Prosas, México, 1917
Poemas, México, 1917
Discursos, México, 1918
Poesías, 1842-1912, México, 1938
Evolución política del pueblo mexicano, México, 1941
Justo Sierra. Prosas, México, 1939
Obras completas, XV vols., México, 1948-1949.

See also
Mexican literature

References

Further reading
Garciadiego Dantan, Javier. "De Justo Sierra a Vasconcelos. La Universidad Nacional durante la revolución mexicana." Historia Mexicana, vol. 46. No. 4. Homenaje a don Edmundo O'Gorman (April–June 1997), pp. 769–819.
Hale, Charles A. Justo Sierra. Un liberal del Porfiriato. Mexico: Fondo de Cultura Económica 1997.

 This article draws on the biography of Sierra by the Academia Mexicana de la Lengua (in Spanish), and on Sierra's works.
 The National Autonomous University of Mexico published his complete works with the direction of Agustín Yáñez in the 1940s.

1848 births
1912 deaths
Liberalism in Mexico
Porfiriato
Members of the Chamber of Deputies (Mexico)
Presidents of the Chamber of Deputies (Mexico)
Historians of Mexico
19th-century Mexican poets
Mexican male poets
20th-century Mexican historians
Mexican Secretaries of Education
People from Campeche
University and college founders
Politicians from Campeche City
Members of the Mexican Academy of Language
Ambassadors of Mexico to Spain
Mexican people of Irish descent
19th-century Mexican historians